Ičko’s House is a cultural monument of importance to Belgrade and is located in Zemun, at 18 Bežanijska Street.

Description 
Ičko’s House is a Classical-style building, built in 1793. It consists of a basement, ground floor and partial second floor formed by a high gable roof with dormers. The tavern Marko Kraljević was on the ground floor, while the first floor was used for housing. The building is one of the oldest preserved houses, and is representative of a town house at the end of the eighteenth century.

The building is known as Ičko’s House because the rebel diplomat and trader Petar Ičko stayed in it from 1802–1803 when he had to leave Belgrade after the return to power of the Dahije. Ičko played a role in the First Serbian Uprising in 1804, working with the Serbian rebels.

Gallery

References

First Serbian Uprising
Houses completed in 1793
Houses in Serbia
Buildings and structures in Belgrade
Cultural Monuments of Great Importance (Serbia)